Canajoharie is a town in Montgomery County, New York, United States. The population was 3,730 in 2010. Canajoharie is located south of the Mohawk River on the southern border of the county. The Erie Canal passes along the northern town line. There is also a village of Canajoharie in the town. Both are east of Utica and west of Amsterdam.

These were settled as European-American jurisdictions, named for the historic Mohawk village of the same name, which was also known as the Mohawk Upper Castle.

History 
The town is near the former site of Canajoharie, an important village of the Mohawk nation that also became known as the Upper Castle. The Mohawk had as their territory most of the central area of present-day New York, from the Hudson River west to where Oneida territory started.  They also used the St. Lawrence River valley as hunting grounds after 1601. They dominated the fur trade with the French based in central Quebec, and with Dutch and later English in eastern New York. French, Dutch and later English trappers and traders came to this Mohawk village to trade. Both the French and Dutch married or had unions with Mohawk women, increasing their ties with the people. Their mixed-race children married into the Dutch and later English communities. Many of their sons also became interpreters or traders.

Anglo-Europeans began settling in the area circa1737, and the Mohawk gradually adopted certain English customs in their village. Because the Mohawk and three other Iroquois nations were allied with the British during the Revolutionary War, they were forced to cede most of their lands in New York after the United States' victory. The state sold millions of acres of land to speculators and private owners.

The town of Canajoharie was consumed by fire twice,  causing an ordinance to be passed prohibiting homes to be constructed of wood. Therefore, many of the older homes in the town are made of brick or locally quarried stone.

After the Revolutionary War, George Washington visited Canajoharie after surveying the damage to nearby Cherry Valley. He stayed the night at the Van Alstyne home, a common meeting place. The Van Alstyne house has long been referred to by some as Ft. Rensselaer; the actual Ft. Rensselaer (destroyed sometime before the French-Indian War) was in nearby Fort Plain.

The modern town was formed in 1788, but was reduced in size to create the towns of Minden (1797) and Root (in part, 1822). While the Mohawk Valley developed with the completion of the Erie Canal, the project also enabled considerable migration from New York to the Midwest. The population of the town in 1865 was 4,248.

Beech-Nut, the baby food producer, was founded in Canajoharie in 1890 during the period of early industrialization in the river valley. It served as the largest employer in the town for more than a century. In March 2011, the Beech-Nut factory moved out of Canajoharie, relocating to a new factory in the nearby town of Florida, near Amsterdam on the south side of the river, still in Montgomery County.

Notable people 

Susan B. Anthony, women's rights pioneer, taught school here
Frank Barbour, football player, coach, and businessman 
Joseph Brant (1743–1807), Mohawk chief
Molly Brant (1736–1796), Mohawk leader
Thomas Burdick, leader in early Latter Day Saint movement, Mormon pioneer, politician in California
Chad Michael Collins (b. 1979), actor
Alfred Conkling, lawyer, statesman, and jurist
Frederick Conkling, son of Alfred Conkling and brother of Roscoe Conkling; became congressman for state of New York
Josiah Failing, 4th Mayor of Portland, Oregon; gained wealth as entrepreneur through general merchandise
Bernhard Gillam, political cartoonist; died of typhoid in Canajoharie
Myron Grimshaw, Major League Baseball player; right fielder for Boston Red Sox 1905-1907
Dan Hunt, football head coach, Colgate University
Thomas James, former slave of Asa Kimball who became minister in upstate New York
John Keyes, first Adjutant General of Connecticut
Jacob Klock, colonel of 2nd regiment of Tryon County militia during Revolutionary War
James Knox, U.S. Representative from Illinois
Mary Anne Krupsak, lawyer and politician, Lieutenant Governor of New York 1975-78
Sean MacFarland, Lieutenant General, Army, Commanding General of 1st Armored Division and Fort Bliss, Texas, later Commanding General of III Corps and Fort Hood, Texas
Charles McVean, Congressman for New York; while in Canajoharie, was editor of town's newspaper
George A. Mitchell, founder of Cadillac, Michigan
Ots-Toch, 17th Century Mohawk woman from Canajoharie who married Dutch trader Cornelius Anthonisse Van Slyck, founding Van Slyck family in New Netherland

Hendrick Theyanoguin (1692–1755), Mohawk leader
Benjamin Van Alstyne, head coach of Michigan State University basketball team 1927–1949
Amy Vedder, ecologist and primatologist involved in conservation work with mountain gorillas
Rebecca Winters, Mormon pioneer

Geography

The southern town line is the border of Schoharie County, while the northern town boundary is defined by the Mohawk River.

The New York State Thruway crosses the northern part of the town, following the river.  New York State Route 5S parallels the Thruway.  New York State Route 10 is a north-south highway, intersecting the Thruway and NY-5S at Canajoharie village.

Demographics

As of the census of 2000, there were 3,797 people, 1,492 households, and 1,026 families residing in the town.  The population density was 88.5 people per square mile (34.2/km2).  There were 1,637 housing units at an average density of 38.2 per square mile (14.7/km2).  The racial makeup of the town was 97.02% White, 0.63% Black or African American, 0.40% Native American, 0.50% Asian, 0.32% from other races, and 1.13% from two or more races. Hispanic or Latino of any race were 1.13% of the population.

There were 1,492 households, out of which 33.2% had children under the age of 18 living with them, 53.0% were married couples living together, 11.3% had a female householder with no husband present, and 31.2% were non-families. 26.1% of all households were made up of individuals, and 12.2% had someone living alone who was 65 years of age or older.  The average household size was 2.52 and the average family size was 3.00.

In the town, the population was spread out, with 26.3% under the age of 18, 7.5% from 18 to 24, 25.8% from 25 to 44, 23.7% from 45 to 64, and 16.8% who were 65 years of age or older.  The median age was 39 years. For every 100 females, there were 94.1 males.  For every 100 females age 18 and over, there were 91.0 males.

The median income for a household in the town was $31,701, and the median income for a family was $39,646. Males had a median income of $29,107 versus $22,617 for females. The per capita income for the town was $16,702.  About 11.0% of families and 11.3% of the population were below the poverty line, including 17.8% of those under age 18 and 3.3% of those age 65 or over.

Communities and locations in the town 
Ames – A village in the southern section  of the town on NY-10.
Bowmans Creek – A stream in the southern part of the town.
 Budd Hill – A location at the southern town line, south of Ames.
Buel – A hamlet in the southwestern section of the town, on Bowmans Creek. The community and much of the southern part of Canajoharie were once called Bowmans Creek, after early settler Jacob Bowman.
Canajoharie – A village in the northern part of the town, on the Mohawk River and NY-10.
Canajoharie Creek – A stream in the south central part of the town.
Canajoharie Falls – A waterfall located south of the Village of Canajoharie.
Fort Plain – A village that is partly in the town at the western town line.
 Maple Hill – A location east of Marshville.
 Mapletown – A location near the eastern town line, named after local trees.
 Marshville – A hamlet south of Canajoharie village on NY-10.
Sprout Brook – A hamlet in the southwestern part of the town, on Bowmans Creek.
Van Deusenville – A hamlet near the town line in the southwestern section  of the town.
 Waterville – A hamlet northeast of Ames.

References in popular culture
They Might Be Giants featured a song titled "Canajoharie" on their 2011 album Join Us (2011).
 Canajoharie is the title of a melancholic, Pop inspired piano piece at the album Mia Brentano’s Hidden Sea: 20 Songs for 2 Pianos by Benyamin Nuss & Max Nyberg (2018).

References

External links

 Brief summary history
  Palatine Bridge/Canajoharie information

Towns in Montgomery County, New York
1788 establishments in New York (state)
Populated places on the Mohawk River
Populated places established in 1788